Gligorije (Gliša) Geršić (also Gliša Giga Geršić); (19 July 1842, Bela Crkva – 1918, Belgrade, Kingdom of Serbia) was a  Serbian politician, jurist, writer and professor. More of an academic than a politician, he did not fit in with the most assertive group of noted Radicals, though intellectually he belonged to the very top of the People's Radical Party's echelon, politically he did not.

Glisić's family came from Bela Crkva, then in southern Hungary, part of the Habsburg Empire. He graduated from gymnasium and attended law schools in Budapest and Vienna before getting a teaching post at the Belgrade's Velika škola (Grandes écoles) in 1866.

In politics, he first allied himself with the Liberals but later he switched sides and joined the founders of the People's Radical Party in 1881.

In 1883, professor Geršić was charged with conspiracy against the Crown (Timok Rebellion) and brought to trial where he was acquitted of all alleged charges. He served as the Minister of Justice in three different cabinets between 1888 and 1892. His contribution to the drafting of the 1888 Constitution carried weight since he was regarded as the prime authority in the field of constitutional law. He was twice elected to the Serbian State Senate (1889-1894 and 1901-1909).

Works
it is said that late 19th- and early 20th-century Serbian legal philosophy and theory was shaped with the writings and lectures of Gligorije Giga Geršić.
Also, Glišić is credited for being the first Serbian writer to translate Shakespeare's play "Richard III" in 1864.

References 

1842 births
1918 deaths
Serbian jurists
Education ministers of Serbia
Justice ministers of Serbia